Lower Panzara Dam, also known as Akkalpada Dam is an earthfill dam on Panzara river near Akkalpada (Sakri) in Dhule district in Maharashtra, India.

Specifications

Purpose
 Irrigation

See also
 Dams in Maharashtra
 List of reservoirs and dams in India

References

Dams in Dhule district
Earth-filled dams
Year of establishment missing